Balck is a surname. Notable people with the surname include:

 Heike Balck (born 1970), retired German high jumper
 Hermann Balck (1893–1982), general in Nazi Germany's Wehrmacht
 Viktor Balck (1844–1928), Swedish officer and sports personality, and one of the original members of the International Olympic Committee
 William Balck (1858–1924), general in German Army
 Allen Balck (2000-), Osu! 5 digit grinder

See also
 Balk
 Black